The nominations for the 18th Vancouver Film Critics Circle Awards, honoring the best in filmmaking in 2017, were announced on December 15, 2017. Lady Bird led with five nominations, followed by Phantom Thread with four.

The winners were announced on December 18, 2017. Lady Bird won three awards, including Best Film.

Winners and nominees

International

Best Film
 Lady Bird
 Dunkirk
 Phantom Thread

Best Director
 Paul Thomas Anderson – Phantom Thread
 Greta Gerwig – Lady Bird
 Christopher Nolan – Dunkirk

Best Actor
 Daniel Day-Lewis – Phantom Thread
 Timothée Chalamet – Call Me by Your Name
 Gary Oldman – Darkest Hour

Best Actress
 Saoirse Ronan – Lady Bird
 Sally Hawkins – The Shape of Water
 Frances McDormand – Three Billboards Outside Ebbing, Missouri

Best Supporting Actor
 Willem Dafoe – The Florida Project
 Armie Hammer – Call Me by Your Name
 Sam Rockwell – Three Billboards Outside Ebbing, Missouri

Best Supporting Actress
 Laurie Metcalf – Lady Bird
 Allison Janney – I, Tonya
 Lesley Manville – Phantom Thread

Best Screenplay
 Jordan Peele – Get Out
 Greta Gerwig – Lady Bird
 Martin McDonagh – Three Billboards Outside Ebbing, Missouri

Best Foreign-Language Film
 BPM (Beats per Minute)
 A Fantastic Woman
 The Square

Best Documentary
 Ex Libris: The New York Public Library
 Faces Places
 Jane

Canadian

Best Canadian Film
 Never Steady, Never Still
 Black Cop
 Fail to Appear

Best Director of a Canadian Film
 Kathleen Hepburn – Never Steady, Never Still
 Sofia Bohdanowicz – Maison du Bonheur
 Denis Côté – A Skin So Soft

Best Actor in a Canadian Film
 Ronnie Rowe – Black Cop
 Jared Abrahamson – Gregoire
 Anthony Therrien – Fake Tattoos

Best Actress in a Canadian Film
 Shirley Henderson – Never Steady, Never Still
 Deragh Campbell – Fail to Appear
 Rose-Marie Perreault – Fake Tattoos

Best Supporting Actor in a Canadian Film
 Ben Cotton – Gregoire
 Joe Buffalo – Luk'Luk'I
 Nathan Roder – Fail to Appear

Best Supporting Actress in a Canadian Film
 Morgan Taylor Campbell – Gregoire
 Grace Glowicki – Cardinals
 Yaité Ruiz – All You Can Eat Buddha

Best Screenplay of a Canadian Film
 Pascal Plante – Fake Tattoos
 Cody Bown – Gregoire
 Kathleen Hepburn – Never Steady, Never Still

Best Canadian Documentary
 Maison du Bonheur — Sofia Bohdanowicz In the Waves — Jacquelyn Mills
 A Skin So Soft — Denis Côté
 Unarmed Verses — Charles Officer

One to Watch
 Cody Bown – Gregoire
 Winston DeGiobbi – Mass for Shut-Ins
 Seth A. Smith – The Crescent

Best British Columbia Film
 Never Steady, Never Still
 Gregoire
 Luk'Luk'I
 The Road Forward

References

External links
 

2017
2017 film awards
2017 in Canadian cinema
2017 in British Columbia